The Faubourg Marigny neighborhood of New Orleans, Louisiana is one of the most active on Mardi Gras Day, with many elaborate costumers strolling the streets. This part of town is relatively little visited by tourists compared to other areas with active celebrations.

The informal walking krewes "Society of Saint Anne" and "The Pair-O-Dice Tumbers" parade through the neighborhood and surrounding areas, as do many smaller groups and individual revelers in costume.  In 2008, WWL-TV personality and Carnival historian Professor Carl Nivale made the Marigny his new base of operations for The Compleat Carnival Compendium & Mardi Gras Manual.

See also
 Faubourg Marigny
 French Quarter Mardi Gras costumes
 New Orleans Mardi Gras

Mardi Gras in New Orleans